Ortiz v. United States, 585 U.S. ___ (2018), was a United States Supreme Court case regarding the nature of the United States Court of Appeals for the Armed Forces (USCAAF) in relationship to Article III Courts. The Court determined that it had jurisdiction to rule on appeals from the USCAAF, even though that court was created by Congress via Article I of the United States Constitution and is not an Article III court. The case was centered on the United States Constitution's separation of powers doctrine. The Court declared the Appointments Clause does not impose a prohibition on an officer of the United States from serving in two roles simultaneously. Rather, the clause only concerns itself with the method of appointment. 

The case is notable for the court's reliance on the 1803 case of Marbury v. Madison.

Facts

Ortiz was an airman convicted by a military tribunal of distributing child pornography, and sentenced to two years in prison followed by a dishonorable discharge. His sentence was affirmed by the Air Force Court of Criminal Appeals (AFCCA), by a panel which included Colonel Martin Mitchell, who had been appointed to that body by the Secretary of Defense, and by the President of the United States, with the advice and consent of the Senate. Ortiz sought review, asserting that Mitchell's presence on the panel violated statute law and the Appointments Clause of the U.S. Constitution.

See also 
 List of United States Supreme Court cases, volume 585

Notes and references

External links 
 

Appointments Clause case law
United States Supreme Court cases
United States administrative case law
2018 in United States case law
United States Supreme Court cases of the Roberts Court
United States separation of powers case law